Kane Strang is a New Zealand musician from Dunedin. He has released a demo album, A Pebble and a Paper Crane (2013), and two commercial albums: Blue Cheese (Ba Da Bing Records, 2016) and Two Hearts and No Brain (Dead Oceans, 2017).

Background
Strang grew up in Dunedin, New Zealand around a family of musicians.

After completing secondary school, Strang co-founded a band, Dinosaur Sanctuary. They released their debut album, A Public Toilet Told Me Nothing Gets Better, in 2013.

Later that same year, Strang travelled to Germany, staying with his childhood friend, Rassani Tolovaa.

During his stay, Strang recorded multiple songs in a World War II bomb shelter. Upon returning to New Zealand, Strang self-released these songs in his debut EP, entitled  A Pebble And A Paper Crane .

References

Year of birth missing (living people)
Musicians from Dunedin
Indie pop musicians
Living people